Osbert Mordaunt is the name of two first-class cricketers:
 
 Osbert Mordaunt (cricketer, born 1842) (1842–1923)
 Osbert Mordaunt (cricketer, born 1876) (1876–1949)